George Barbier, né Georges Augustin Barbier, (1882–1932) was one of the great French illustrators of the early 20th century.

Biography 
Born in Nantes, France on 16 October 1882, Barbier was 29 years old when he mounted his first exhibition in 1911 and was subsequently swept to the forefront of his profession with commissions to design theatre and ballet costumes, to illustrate books, and to produce haute couture fashion illustrations.

For the next 20 years Barbier led a group from the Ecole des Beaux Arts who were nicknamed by Vogue "The Knights of the Bracelet"—a tribute to their fashionable and flamboyant mannerisms and style of dress. Included in this élite circle were Bernard Boutet de Monvel and Pierre Brissaud (both of whom were Barbier's first cousins), Paul Iribe, Georges Lepape, and Charles Martin.

During his career Barbier also turned his hand to jewellery, glass and wallpaper design, wrote essays and many articles for the prestigious Gazette du bon ton. In the mid-1920s he worked with Erté to design sets and costumes for the Folies Bergère and in 1929 he wrote the introduction for Erté's acclaimed exhibition and achieved mainstream popularity through his regular appearances in L'Illustration magazine.

Barbier died in 1932 at the very pinnacle of his success. He is buried in Cemetery Miséricorde, Nantes.

References

Further reading

Publications by Barbier 

 Georges Lepape, Paul Iribe, and George Barbier. L'éventail Et La Fourrure Chez Paquin. (Paris: Maquet, 1911). 
 René Kieffer, ed. Dessins de George Barbier, 1920. 
George Barbier. Falbalas et Fanfreluches Pour 1925. (Paris: Meynial, 1925). 
Madeleine Ginsburg, ed. Art Deco Costumes (London: Bracken Books, 1988). Reproduces the complete plates from the almanacs Falbalas et fanfreluches, by George Barbier, Meynial, Paris, 1922-1926.

Secondary Sources 
Edmond Jaloux. George Barbier, Vingt-Cinq Costumes Pour Le Théâtre. (Paris: C. Bloch & J. Meynial, 1927). 
Jean-Louis Vaudoyer, Henri Régnier, and Charles Martin. George Barbier. (Paris: Henry Babou, 1929). 
Frederica T. Harlow, ed. The illustrations of George Barbier: in full color (New York: Dover Publications, 1977). 
Kris Somerville. George Barbier: The Knight of the Bracelet. (Columbia, Mo: College of Arts & Science of the University of Missouri—Columbia, 2006). 
Barbara Martorelli. Pictures of Elegance. (Twickenham, Middlesex: Guineapiguana Publications, 2008). 
Barbier Fashion: Postcards. (Mineola, N.Y.: Dover, 2011). 
Hiroshi Unno. Joruju Barubie: Yūbi to Gensō No Irasutorētā [George Barbier : Master of Art Deco : Fashion, Illustration and Graphic Design] (Tōkyō: Pai Intānashonaru, 2011).

Exhibition Catalogs 
Catalogue of an Exhibition of Watercolours by Artists of the Gazette Du Bon Ton. (London: Fine Art Society, 1914).  Exhibition at the Fine Art Society in London, June 1914.
Le bon ton: 1910-1950: Mode, Theater und Gesellschaft: Originalzeichnumngen von Léon Bakst, George Barbier, Christian Bérard, Eduardo García Benito, Paul Iribe, Georges Lepape, Francis Marshall, and André-Edouard Marty. (München: Galerie Bartsch & Chariau, 1990).  Catalogue of an exhibition held at Galerie Bartsch & Chariau, München, 5 Oct. 1990 - 31 Jan. 1991.
Barbara Martorelli. George Barbier: La Nascita Del Déco. (Venezia: Marsilio, 2008). . Catalog of an exhibition held at the Museo Fortuny, Venice, Italy, Aug. 30, 2008-Jan. 5, 2009.
Barbara Martorelli. George Barbier: The Birth of Art Déco (New York: Rizzoli, 2009).  English translation.
Jean E. Laboureur, Shigeru Kashima, and Hiroko Ono. Barubie X Raburūru: Āru Deko, Shikisai to Senbyō No Irasutorēshon (Tōkyō : Kyūryūdō, 2012). . Catalog of an exhibition held at Nerima Kuritsu Bijutsukan, Tokyo, April 8-June 3, 2012. 
Arthur M. Smith. 'Chevalier Du Bracelet': George Barbier and His Illustrated Works (Toronto, Ontario: University of Toronto Library, 2013).  . Catalogue of an exhibition held at the Thomas Fisher Rare Book Library, Toronto, Ontario from 30 September - 20 December 2013.

External links

 
 Art Deco Prints Posters Pochoirs at www.art-deco-prints-and-posters.com
 The Romance of Perfume by George Barbier at www.finevintageart.com/george-barbier
  video about George Barbier from Tom Vaughan-Johnston

1882 births
1932 deaths
French illustrators
Modern artists
Art Nouveau illustrators
Art Deco artists
French LGBT artists